The Bangala is a river of northeastern Tanzania. It is a tributary of the Mkuzu River and is fed by a waterfall named the Soni Falls.

References

Rivers of Tanzania